The 2013 ABSA Under-19 Provincial Championship will be contested from 12 July to 26 October 2013. The tournament will feature the Under-19 players from the fourteen provincial rugby unions in South Africa.

Competition

Group A
There are seven participating teams in the 2013 ABSA Under-19 Provincial Championship Group A. These teams will play each other twice over the course of the season, once at home and once away.

Teams will receive four points for a win and two points for a draw. Bonus points are awarded to teams that score 4 or more tries in a game, as well as to teams that lose a match by 7 points or less. Teams are ranked by points, then points difference (points scored less points conceded).

The top 4 teams will qualify for the title play-offs. In the semi-finals, the team that finish first has home advantage against the team that finish fourth, while the team that finish second has home advantage against the team that finish third. The winners of these semi-finals will play each other in the final, at the same venue as the 2013 Currie Cup Premier Division Final.

The bottom team in Group A will play a play-off game at home against the winner of the Group B final for a place in Group A in 2014.

Group B
There are eight participating teams in the 2013 ABSA Under-19 Provincial Championship Group B. These teams will play each other once over the course of the season, either at home or away.

Teams will receive four points for a win and two points for a draw. Bonus points are awarded to teams that score 4 or more tries in a game, as well as to teams that lose a match by 7 points or less. Teams are ranked by points, then points difference (points scored less points conceded).

The top 4 teams will qualify for the title play-offs. In the semi-finals, the team that finish first has home advantage against the team that finish fourth, while the team that finish second has home advantage against the team that finish third. The winners of these semi-finals will play each other in the final, at the same venue as the 2013 Currie Cup First Division Final.

The winner of the final will play a play-off game away from home against the bottom team in Group A for a place in Group A in 2014.

Teams

Team listing
The following teams will take part in the 2012 ABSA Under-19 Provincial Championship competition:

Group A

Log

Fixtures and results
 Fixtures are subject to change.
 All times are South African (GMT+2).

Regular season

Round one

Round two

Round three

Round four

Round five

Round six

Round seven

Round eight

Round nine

Round ten

Round eleven

Round twelve

Round thirteen

Round fourteen

Play-off games

Semi-finals

Final

Group B

Table

Fixtures and results
 Fixtures are subject to change.
 All times are South African (GMT+2).

Regular season

Round one

Round two

Round three

Round four

Round five

Round six

Round seven

Play-off games

Semi-finals

Final

Promotion/relegation play-off

  promoted to Group A.
  relegated to Group B.

See also
 2013 Currie Cup Premier Division
 2013 Currie Cup First Division
 2013 Vodacom Cup
 2013 Under-21 Provincial Championship

External links

References

2013 rugby union tournaments for clubs
2013
2013 in South African rugby union